Krypton difluoride, KrF2 is a chemical compound of krypton and fluorine. It was the first compound of krypton discovered. It is a volatile, colourless solid at room temperature. The structure of the KrF2 molecule is linear, with Kr−F distances of 188.9 pm. It reacts with strong Lewis acids to form salts of the KrF+ and Kr cations.  

The atomization energy of KrF2 (KrF2(g) → Kr(g) + F2(g)) is 21.9 kcal/mol, giving an average Kr–F bond energy of only 11 kcal/mol, the weakest of any isolable fluoride.  In comparison, difluorine is held together by a bond of 36 kcal/mol.  Consequently, KrF2 is a good source of the extremely reactive and oxidizing atomic fluorine.  It is thermally unstable, with a decomposition rate of 10% per hour at room temperature.  Krypton difluoride is endothermic, with a heat of formation of 14.4 ± 0.8 kcal/mol measured at 93 °C.

Synthesis
Krypton difluoride can be synthesized using many different methods including electrical discharge, photoionization, hot wire, and proton bombardment. The product can be stored at −78 °C without decomposition.

Electrical discharge
Electric discharge was the first method used to make krypton difluoride. It was also used in the only experiment ever reported to produce krypton tetrafluoride, although the identification of krypton tetrafluoride was later shown to be mistaken. The electrical discharge method involves having 1:1 to 2:1 mixtures of F2 to Kr at a pressure of 40 to 60 torr and then arcing large amounts of energy between it. Rates of almost 0.25 g/h can be achieved. The problem with this method is that it is unreliable with respect to yield.

Proton bombardment
Using proton bombardment for the production of KrF2 has a maximum production rate of about 1 g/h. This is achieved by bombarding mixtures of Kr and F2 with a proton beam operating at an energy level of 10 MeV and at a temperature of about 133 K. It is a fast method of producing relatively large amounts of KrF2, but requires a source of high-energy protons, which usually would come from a cyclotron.

Photochemical
The successful photochemical synthesis of krypton difluoride was first reported by Lucia V. Streng in 1963. It was next reported in 1975 by J. Slivnik. The photochemical process for the production of KrF2 involves the use of UV light and can produce under ideal circumstances 1.22 g/h. The ideal wavelengths to use are in the range of 303–313 nm. Harder UV radiation is detrimental to the production of KrF2. Using Pyrex glass or Vycor or quartz will significantly increase yield because they all block harder UV light. In a series of experiments performed by S. A Kinkead et al., it was shown that a quartz insert (UV cut off of 170 nm) produced on average 158 mg/h, Vycor 7913 (UV cut off of 210 nm) produced on average 204 mg/h and Pyrex 7740 (UV cut off of 280 nm) produced on average 507 mg/h. It is clear from these results that higher-energy ultraviolet light reduces the yield significantly. The ideal circumstances for the production KrF2 by a photochemical process appear to occur when krypton is a solid and fluorine is a liquid, which occur at 77 K. The biggest problem with this method is that it requires the handling of liquid F2 and the potential of it being released if it becomes overpressurized.

Hot wire
The hot wire method for the production of KrF2 uses krypton in a solid state with a hot wire running a few centimeters away from it as fluorine gas is then run past the wire. The wire has a large current, causing it to reach temperatures around 680 °C. This causes the fluorine gas to split into its radicals, which then can react with the solid krypton. Under ideal conditions, it has been known to reach a maximum yield of 6 g/h. In order to achieve optimal yields the gap between the wire and the solid krypton should be 1 cm, giving rise to a temperature gradient of about 900 °C/cm. A major downside to this method is the amount of electricity that has to be passed through the wire. It is dangerous if not properly set up.

Structure

Krypton difluoride can exist in one of two possible crystallographic morphologies: α-phase and β-phase. β-KrF2 generally exists at above −80 °C, while α-KrF2 is more stable at lower temperatures. The unit cell of α-KrF2 is body-centred tetragonal.

Chemistry
Krypton difluoride is primarily a powerful oxidising and fluorinating agent: for example, it can oxidise gold to its highest-known oxidation state, +5. It is more powerful even than elemental fluorine due to the even lower bond energy of Kr–F compared to F–F, with a redox potential of +3.5 V for the KrF2/Kr couple, making it the most powerful known oxidising agent, though  could be even stronger:

 7  (g) + 2 Au (s) → 2 KrFAuF (s) + 5 Kr (g)

KrFAuF decomposes at 60 °C into gold(V) fluoride and krypton and fluorine gases:

 KrFAuF →  (s) + Kr (g) +  (g)

 can also directly oxidise xenon to xenon hexafluoride:

 3  + Xe →  + 3 Kr

Irradiation of a crystal of KrF2 at 77 K with γ-rays leads to the formation of the krypton monofluoride radical, KrF•, a violet-colored species that was identified by its ESR spectrum.  The radical, trapped in the crystal lattice, is stable indefinitely at 77 K but decomposes at 120 K.

See also
Krypton fluoride laser

References

General reading

External links
 NIST Chemistry WebBook: krypton difluoride

Fluorides
Nonmetal halides
Krypton compounds